Derby Airport may refer to:

 Derby Airport (Australia), airport located at Derby, Western Australia
 Derby Airport (England), former airport which was located at Burnaston, Derbyshire

See also
 Derby Airfield, airfield located at Egginton, Derbyshire, England